Igbon Island (variously Polopina Island or Balubadiangan Island) is an island and barangay in northeastern Iloilo, Philippines. It is part of the municipality of Concepcion. According to the 2010 census, it has a population of 2,547. The island is moderately known in the Philippines for its scuba diving.

Location and geography 
Igbon Island is east of Panay Island in the Visayan Sea. Other nearby islands include Bulubadiangan Island and Danao-Danao Island. Its sole barangay is Igbon, which has one school, the Claudia Morata Villarias Memorial School.

Natural disasters

Guimaras oil spill

On 11 August 2006, a tanker capsized off the coast of Guimaras Island south of Panay. In September 2006, the Regional Disaster Coordinating Council (RDCC) identified Igbon as one of 38 municipalities threatened by the oil spill.

Typhoon Haiyan 

In 2013, Typhoon Haiyan (locally known as Yolanda) caused heavy damage to Igbon. The typhoon unexpectedly struck Igbon at low tide, although residents were able to take shelter near the mountain areas. Relief workers distributed food aid to island residents after the storm passed.

See also 

 List of islands in the Philippines

References

External links
 Igbon Island at OpenStreetMap

Islands of Iloilo
Barangays of Iloilo